Telesio  may refer to:
Bernardino Telesio (1509–1588), Italian philosopher and natural scientist
Telesio Interlandi (1894–1965), Italian journalist and anti-semitic propagandist
11278 Telesio, a main-belt asteroid named after Bernardino Telesio